Dickson D. Despommier (June 5, 1940) is an emeritus professor of microbiology and Public Health at Columbia University. From 1971 to 2009, he conducted research on intracellular parasitism and taught courses on parasitic diseases, medical ecology and ecology. Despommier has received media coverage for his ideas on vertical farming.

Research
Despommier has research interest in the ecotone, a transition area between two biomes,  as a zone of high disease transmission and also in the spread of schistosomiasis, malaria, and a variety of helminths (ascaris, hookworm, trichuris) in agricultural areas. Despommier has studied the ecology of West Nile virus with a focus on related patterns of weather.

Research and findings on Trichinella spiralis, the causative agent of trichinosis, have resulted in a large body of literature. Despommier is especially known for his research findings in this area which led to numerous advances in the understanding of the "muscle stage" of the organism, and how it maintains itself in the host for long periods of time in the Nurse cell/parasite complex (weeks to years in some cases).

He developed his concept of vertical farming over a 10-year period with graduate students in a medical ecology class beginning in 1999, with work continued by designer Chris Jacobs and Ontarian eco-architect Gordon Graff from the University of Waterloo's School of Architecture.

Science outreach to the public

In June 2008 Despommier appeared on the "Colbert Report", where he described the concept of vertical farming to Stephen Colbert.

He is a regular panel-member of the podcast This Week in Virology, produced by his colleague Vincent Racaniello.

Books
Despommier has authored or co-authored ten books:

 
 
 
 
 
 
 
 
 

Chapters by Professor Despommier:

 Despommier, D. (2020). Vertical farming systems for urban agriculture. In: Wiskerke, J. S. C. Achieving sustainable urban agriculture. Cambridge: Burleigh Dodds Science Publishing.

References

External links

 Columbia University Biography
 
 

American microbiologists
American ecologists
American parasitologists
Living people
1940 births
Columbia University faculty
Columbia University alumni
University of Notre Dame alumni
Scientists from New Orleans
20th-century American scientists
21st-century American scientists